No Stone Unturned is a compilation album by The Rolling Stones released in 1973. Eight of the twelve tracks had been previously released on single b-sides in the United Kingdom, and the rest had been released on EPs.

The song "Sad Day" was released as a single from the album.

Neither the album or the single "Sad Day" were released with consent from the band, who had lost control over their pre-1971 catalog when they terminated their contract with Decca Records.  Decca would continue to release such unauthorized albums over the next several decades.

Track listing
All songs composed by Mick Jagger and Keith Richards except as noted.

Digital release

In 2013, ABKCO included No Stone Unturned Vol. 1 and No Stone Unturned Vol. 2 in their comprehensive iTunes digital release The Rolling Stones 1963-1971. As that release focused on the UK album configurations, the two volumes included 43 "singles, B sides and more" not included in the original UK studio albums and EPs, including many of their biggest hits, which were often contained in their US album counterparts, e.g. "(I Can't Get No) Satisfaction" on Out of Our Heads, "Paint It Black" on Aftermath and "Let's Spend the Night Together" on Between the Buttons.

The digital release of No Stone Unturned was designed in a similar fashion to The Beatles' Past Masters compilations: to supplement the band's UK albums and EPs to make a "Complete Collection Box Set" of the entire studio output of the band owned by ABKCO.  Thus, four songs from the 1973 release were not included because they didn't meet this criteria: 
"Poison Ivy (version 2)" – included on The Rolling Stones (EP), the much rarer version 1 was included instead
"Money" –  included on The Rolling Stones (EP)
"I'm Moving On (live)" – live song from Got Live If You Want It! (EP), no live tracks were included
"2120 South Michigan Avenue (short version)" – an edit of the long version included on 12 x 5

No Stone Unturned Vol. 1 and No Stone Unturned Vol. 2 were later released separately on the 7digital service. Similar to Hot Rocks 1964-1971, the collection ends with "Brown Sugar" and "Wild Horses" since ABKCO holds dual copyright ownership in conjunction with The Rolling Stones for those two songs.

Track listing
All songs by Mick Jagger and Keith Richards, except where noted.

References

Albums produced by Andrew Loog Oldham
Albums produced by Jimmy Miller
B-side compilation albums
The Rolling Stones compilation albums
1973 compilation albums
Decca Records compilation albums